S-68 was a sports club from Greenland based in Sisimiut. They competed in football and handball.

Achievements 
Greenlandic Women's Football Championship: 1
Champion : 1992
Third: 1991, 1996, 2000
Greenlandic Men's Handball Championship: 5
Champion: 1975, 1980, 1981, 1982, 1983

References 

Football clubs in Greenland
Handball clubs in Greenland
Association football clubs established in 1968
Handball clubs established in 1968
1968 establishments in Greenland